Kuryag is a rural locality (a selo) and the administrative centre of Guninsky Selsoviet, Tabasaransky District, Republic of Dagestan, Russia. The population was 451 as of 2010. There are 4 streets.

Geography 
Kyuryag is located 21 km southwest of Khuchni (the district's administrative centre) by road. Sikukh and Afna are the nearest rural localities.

References 

Rural localities in Tabasaransky District